Kevin John Arnott (born 8 March 1961) is a former Zimbabwe cricketer who played in four Test matches and 13 One Day Internationals from 1987 to 1993. He was the first Zimbabwean to face a ball in Test cricket, and the second to make a Test century. His highest score in a Test innings was 101 not out made against New Zealand at Bulawayo in 1992.

He appeared in both the World Cup tournaments in 1987 and 1992. His father, Don, played first-class cricket Rhodesia during the 1950s. He is a past pupil of Prince Edward School, Harare and graduated from Cape Town University. He is the first Test cap for Zimbabwe.

After his cricket career, Arnott became a lawyer in Harare.

References

1961 births
Living people
Cricketers from Harare
Zimbabwean cricketers
White Zimbabwean people
Cricketers at the 1987 Cricket World Cup
Cricketers at the 1992 Cricket World Cup
Zimbabwe Test cricketers
Zimbabwe One Day International cricketers